Commission of National Education can refer to:
Commission of National Education established in 1773 in the Polish–Lithuanian Commonwealth, the first ministry of education in the world
Commission of National Education (Ireland), established in 1831

See also
Commission of National Education Association in the U.S.